Edward Hawrot is an American medical scientist, and currently the Alva O. Way University Professor of Medical Science at Brown University. He was previously the Upjohn Professor from 2001 to 2008.

References

Living people
Brown University faculty
21st-century American chemists
Year of birth missing (living people)